Hjálmar Hjálmarsson (born 28 August 1963) is an Icelandic actor and voice actor.

Career 
Hjálmar graduated from the Icelandic Drama School in 1987. He has been involved in numerous productions on stage at the National Theatre of Iceland and Reykjavik City Theatre. He has also been involved in directing and writing several radio and television productions.

He was nominated for an Edda Award in 2003 for his script of Áramótaskaupið 2002.

Personal life 
Hjálmar is married to Guðbjörg Ólafsdóttir, teacher. The couple has three children: Salka Sól, Hjálmar Óli and Adrien Brody (not the actor).

Selected voice credits (Icelandic) 
 Pocahontas (1995) as Wiggins
 One Hundred and One Dalmatians (1995) as Jasper 
 The Swan Princess (1996) as Jean-Bob
 The Hunchback of Notre Dame (1996) as Hugo
 Prince of Egypt (1998) as Rameses II
 Shrek Franchise as Shrek
 Toy Story Franchise as Rex
 Finding Nemo (2003) as Marlin 
 Garfield (2004) as Garfield
 Wreck-It Ralph (2012) as Ralph
 Up (2009) as Campmaster
 Inside Out (2015) as Bing Bong

External links

References 

20th-century Icelandic male actors
21st-century Icelandic male actors
Living people
1963 births
Icelandic male actors
Icelandic male voice actors